Aayiram Naavulla Ananthan is a 1996 Indian Malayalam-language medical action drama film by Thulasidas starring Mammootty, Murali and Gautami.

Plot
Dr. Nandakumar and Anantha Padmanabhan are doctor brothers who live with Ananthan's mother after the death of their father and Nandu's mother. Nandu marries Sridevi with whom they have a daughter while Ananthan marries Radhika. Once Nadhu was too drunk and makes a mistake with one of his patients. Later Ananthan performs surgery on the old man and saves him creating tensions between the brothers.

Cast
Mammootty as  Dr. Anantha Padmanabhan
Murali as  Dr. Nandakumar
Gautami as  Radhika
Madhavi as  Sridevi
Devan as  Idikkula Abraham
Spadikam George as  Jacob
Sukumari as  Ananthan's Mother
Vinduja Menon as  Geetha
Manianpilla Raju as  Madhavan
Sivaji as  Vishwam
Kuthiravattam Pappu as  Koyakka
C. I. Paul as  O. C. Pillai
K. B. Ganesh Kumar as  Raju
Zainuddin as  Kammath
Prathapachandran as  Sridevi's Father
 Sadiq as  Renjith Abraham
Philomina

Soundtrack
"Naagabhooshanam" - B. Arundhathi
"Unniyamma Chirutheyi" - K. S. Chithra

References

External links
 

1990s Malayalam-language films
Films scored by Johnson
1996 drama films
1996 films
Indian drama films
Films directed by Thulasidas